Then Again, Maybe I Won't is a young adult novel written by Judy Blume. Intended for pre-teens and teenagers, the novel deals with puberty from a 1970s male perspective as well as the other trials of growing up. Judy Blume claimed that she was inspired to write the story following the success of her preceding novel Are You There God? It's Me, Margaret. Given her earlier novel was about a girl entering puberty making the transition to womanhood, she decided to write one about a boy going through puberty and making a transition to manhood.

Plot summary
Eleven-year-old Tony Miglione lives with his blue-collar family in Jersey City. After Tony's family experiences a major increase in wealth due to his father's successful sale of his electronics invention, the family relocates to the fictional upper-class community of Rosemont, New York. His mother becomes absorbed with climbing the social ladder in her new, wealthier neighborhood, while his maternal grandmother becomes angry and withdrawn when she is no longer allowed to cook for the family as she loves to do. Tony's older brother, Ralph, a new father who was previously a well-respected junior high school teacher, gives up teaching to make more money working in the same business as their father, causing Tony to feel that his brother is 'selling out'.

Tony meets a neighbor, Joel Hoober, a boy his own age. While Joel's manners impress Mr. and Mrs. Miglione, Tony sees Joel's true colors in private: he secretly engages in misbehaviors such as prank calls, underage drinking, reading graphic novels, and shoplifting, and encourages Tony to participate as well. 

Joel also has an older sister, Lisa, who is 16 years old and beautiful.  Her bedroom window faces Tony's, and Tony soon notices that she does not bother to close her blinds when dressing and undressing; this leads Tony to ask his parents for a pair of binoculars for Christmas – "for birdwatching", he tells them.  (Note: publishers seemed to feel this was an important plot point, as a number of variations of the cover art for this novel feature Tony holding a pair of binoculars.)

Tony begins experiencing anxiety-related spells; namely when Joel is shoplifting. During a trip downtown, Tony suspects Joel stole something and faints in public. He gets admitted to the hospital. After doctors determine the malady is not medical (although he is diagnosed with "nervous stomach", now called IBS), a therapist offers to help Tony. The therapy helps Tony learn new ways to deal with his problems. 

Joel is eventually caught stealing golf balls from a sporting goods store, and Tony refuses to stand up for him when they are stopped by security. Surprisingly, Joel is not angry at him and the two boys agree amicably to end their friendship when Joel is sent to a military academy; he explains to Tony that he acted out simply to see if he could get away with it. Tony's mother (who tries to emulate everything the Hoobers do) considers sending Tony there too, until Tony's father intervenes and says this is a key decision that only Tony should make.  Tony also overcomes his infatuation with Lisa and curtails watching her window after learning of her relationship with his youth group leader.

In the final chapter, Tony is bicycling and talking to himself about his parents building a swimming pool and he is approaching his 14th birthday. Tony is also now more at ease with himself and the family changes, and had the courage to tell the therapist he spied on Lisa. Tony thinks it would be best if he ceases his voyeuristic behavior for good, but finally says to himself 'Then again, maybe I won't.'

Major characters
Anthony (Tony) Miglione – Protagonist of the book who is 11 years old, the youngest of three boys.
Victor (Vic) Miglione – Tony's father, who is a freelance electrician and an inventor whose invention changes their lives.
Carmella Miglione – Tony's mother, who eventually goes by the name Carol, much to Tony's dismay. She becomes self-absorbed with her social status once the family moves to Rosemont.
Ralph Miglione – Tony's older brother who is a teacher at his middle school in Jersey City, but goes into the family business with his father, which angers Tony to no end. Back in Jersey City, Ralph was respected amongst Tony's peers, known as "The Wizard of Seventh Grade Social Studies".
Grandma – Carmella's mother, who cannot speak after having her larynx removed due to cancer. She loves to cook, but was no longer permitted to do so after hiring their housekeeper, so she spends every day in her bedroom watching TV, depressed.
Vincent (Vinnie) Miglione – Tony's deceased eldest brother. He died in Vietnam a few years before the story takes place.
Angie Miglione – Tony's sister-in-law and Ralph's wife.
Vincenza (Vickie) Miglione – Tony's niece, and Angie and Ralph's daughter. She was named after Vinnie.
Joel Hoober – Tony's new friend in Rosemont.  He is a practical joker and a shoplifter.
Marty Endo – One of Tony's new friends who is also one of his basketball teammates and a member of the church youth group.
Scott Gold – Another new friend of Tony's, who is in all of Tony's classes at school. He is often seen with Tony, Marty Endo, and Joel Hoober as a group.
Lisa Hoober – Joel's gorgeous 16-year-old sister, who Tony develops a crush on, and spies on with binoculars via his window
Kathryn (Corky) Thomas – A tomboyish girl of Tony's age who has a crush on him, but he pays her little attention.
J.W. Fullerbach – Vic's new boss and business partner.
Frankie Bollino – Tony's best friend from Jersey City who comes to visit.
Dr. Fogel – Tony's psychiatrist.
Maxine – Housekeeper to the Migliones who directs the house her way and will not let Tony's grandmother cook anymore. She eventfully softens as the book progresses.
Millicent – Hispanic housekeeper to the Hoobers who seems to be the only one who is aware of Joel's antics because one night when Tony is at Joel's house she catches them in Lisa's room.

Theme
While this novel is similar to aspects of Are You There God? It's Me, Margaret., it differs mainly in the secondary themes. While Margaret struggles with her issues of religion and being raised in an interfaith family, Tony Miglione struggles with the issues of his family's social status and to a lesser extent, American society. A similarity of both stories, aside from the physical maturity of both characters, is that Tony develops a crush on the eldest daughter of his next door neighbors, just as Margaret has feelings for her neighbor's friend; including experiencing his first wet dream about her. However, Tony also has to deal with the fact that she is three years older than he is, and, that if such a crush developed further, the age difference would be uncommon among boys he knows. Both stories also deal with moving from an urban area to the suburbs, but the reason behind the move for Tony's family is his father's success with his invention and desire to move to a wealthier community.

Themes dealt with include the effects on Tony of losing the working-class life he had been used to in his Italian-American neighborhood in Jersey City, and being ill at ease in his new upper-class community. In addition, Tony's grandmother has been marginalized, as she loved to cook for the family in Jersey City but is told that this would be inappropriate in their new home. She confines herself to her room after the Migliones hire Maxine, a maid who takes advantage of the family's inexperience with their new lifestyle and essentially directs the household to her tastes instead of taking orders from the family. 

Another slight theme touched upon is Tony regaining slight respect for the working class life his parents left behind. Tony and his friends are drinking milkshakes at a malt shop when Joel thinks it is cute to hide the tip inside a partially unconsumed milkshake glass, causing the waitress to make a scene and remark how Joel and his ilk know nothing of workin' for a living and that "your crummy coins buys me a loaf of bread; ever stop and think of that". Tony later remarks to himself he thought for a long time how his spending money goes from his pocket to a supermarket in some low-income neighborhood.

The penultimate chapter in the book deals with the consequences of Joel's immoral actions. Tony and Joel are at a sporting goods store where the employees catch Joel shoplifting golf balls and Tony refuses to aid Joel in lying. Tony anticipates that his parents will learn for themselves of Joel's true nature when they read tomorrow's newspaper and see Joel will be remanded to the juvenile facility, but is surprised when he learns the owner of the sporting goods store declines to press charges against Joel for shoplifting. Joel's father then decides to enroll Joel in a military academy, which he believes will cure Joel of his "I will do what I want, when I want" attitude and deprive him of his pampered lifestyle at the Hoober home.

Setting

The time frame of this story is evidently the late 1960s or early 1970s, as Tony's eldest brother, Vinnie, has been killed in action in the Vietnam War. Initially set in Jersey City, New Jersey, the family eventually moves to Rosemont, New York on Long Island. Other themes touched upon are how Tony's family seems to be knowingly and willingly distancing themselves from their Italian heritage as not many Italian-Americans live in Rosemont (evidence of this is shown when Tony's mother allows herself to be called "Carol" by Mrs. Hoober instead of Carmella, her true name). Another theme is how Tony's family is keeping up with the Joneses by emulating their next door neighbors, the Hoobers (although Tony's mother is clearly more concerned with social image than his father), or how his father trades in his work truck for a new car once Mrs. Hoober asks if they're "having something worked on" (as pickup trucks were mostly only owned by those who needed them for their work in those days). Mr. Hoober is vice president of a pharmaceutical company and is apparently extremely well compensated, which gives his wife the chance to spend her days playing golf and socializing. The Hoobers are representative of the "high-powered American family" and seem to believe the "American way" is about money, materialism, affluent living, social status and not much else. As a result, they do not seem to give much attention to the trouble-making son Joel, who has the idea he can get away with anything because nobody is watching over him or enforcing discipline.

Editions

External links

Judy Blume's website

1971 American novels
Novels by Judy Blume
American young adult novels
Novels set in New Jersey
Novels set in New York City
Culture of Jersey City, New Jersey
Long Island in fiction
Works about puberty